Sabyasachi Dutta is an Indian politician from West Bengal. He belongs to the All India Trinamool Congress and was MLA from Rajarhat New Town Vidhan Sabha Constituency. He has also served as the first Mayor of Bidhannagar Municipal Corporation from 2015 to 2019. In 2019, he joined BJP.

Early life and education
Born to Gouri Sankar Dutta, Sabyasachi Dutta got a Bachelor of Laws in the year 1994 from South Calcutta Law College under Calcutta University.

Political career
Dutta started his political career from Indian National Congress and later joined the All India Trinamool Congress in the late 1990s.

Sabyasachi Dutta was elected councilor in the Bidhannagar Municipality for the first time in the 2000 Municipal elections.
He was re-elected in the 2005 and 2010 Municipal elections.
In 2011, he was elected as a Member of Legislative Assembly from Rajarhat New Town constituency.
In 2015, after the merger of several municipalities and the establishment of the Bidhannagar Municipal Corporation, he was elected as the Mayor of the corporation.
In 2016, he won for the second time as Member of Legislative Assembly.

Before joining BJP, he was a member of the All India Trinamool Congress. He joined Bharatiya Janata Party on 1 October 2019 in presence of BJP President Amit Shah. He has been appointed the Secretary of the West Bengal unit of the Bharatiya Janata Party on 1 June 2020.

In October 2021, Dutta returned to All India Trinamool Congress exactly after two years.

Controversy
In 2019, he stated that Bengal is now becoming a second Pakistan. In 2021, Sabyasachi Dutta remarked that he would send those who oppose Jai Shri Ram to Pakistan.

References

Living people
Bharatiya Janata Party politicians from West Bengal
West Bengal MLAs 2011–2016
Trinamool Congress politicians from West Bengal
1965 births
Indian National Congress politicians from West Bengal
West Bengal MLAs 2016–2021